Kenneth Lambert (7 June 1928 – 29 June 2002) was an English professional footballer from Sheffield. His clubs included Barnsley, Swindon Town, Gillingham and Bradford City. He made 97 Football League appearances.

References

1928 births
2002 deaths
Footballers from Sheffield
English footballers
Gillingham F.C. players
Barnsley F.C. players
Swindon Town F.C. players
Bradford City A.F.C. players
English Football League players
Matlock Town F.C. players
Association football wing halves